Maddox is an English and Welsh surname. Notable people with the surname include:

Allen Maddox (1948–2000), England-born New Zealand painter
Alton H. Maddox Jr. (born 1945), US lawyer
Alva Hugh Maddox (born 1930), US judge
Andre Maddox (born 1982), US American football player
Anthony Maddox (born 1978), US American football player
Austin Maddox (born 1991), US baseball player
Avonte Maddox (born 1996), US American football player
Bob Maddox (born 1949), US American football player
Brad Maddox (born 1984), US professional wrestler
Brenda Maddox (1932–2019), US writer
Bronwen Maddox (born 1963), British journalist 
Bruno Maddox (born 1969), British literary novelist and journalist
Charles Milles Maddox (1934–2017), birth name of US criminal and cult leader Charles Manson
Christine Maddox (born 1950), US model
Claude Maddox (1901–1958), US mobster 
Conroy Maddox (1912–2005), British painter
Curtis Maddox (1935–2018), US American football and basketball coach
Cynthia Maddox (born 1941), US model
David M. Maddox (born 1938), US general
Douglas B. Maddox (born 1966), US film producer
Edgar Maddox (1878–1923), Australian - Australian Rules footballer
Elliott Maddox (born 1947), US baseball player
Ernest Maddox (1863–1933), British surgeon and ophthalmologist
Etta Haynie Maddox (1860–1933), US mezzo-soprano, lawyer and suffragist
Eva Maddox, US interior designer
Everette Maddox (1944–1989), US poet
Ford Madox Ford (1873–1939), British writer
Garry Maddox (born 1949), US baseball player
Gene Maddox (1938–2015), US politician
George Maddox (disambiguation), several people
Halley G. Maddox (1899–1977), United States Army general
Isaac Maddox (1697–1759), British cleric and theologian
J. C. Maddox (1932–2009), US politician
Jacob Maddox (born 1998), British footballer
Jack Maddox (1919–2006), US basketball player
John Maddox (disambiguation), several people
Julius Maddox (born 1987), US powerlifter
Ken Maddox (born 1964), US politician
Lester Maddox (1915–2003), US politician
Marion Maddox, Australian writer
Mark Maddox (born 1968), US American football player
Michael Maddox (1747–1822), British businessman
Nick Maddox (1886–1954), US baseball player 
Nigel Maddox, Royal Air Force air vice-marshal
Ralph Maddox (1908–1944), US American football player
Randy L. Maddox (born 1953), US Methodist minister and theologian
Richard Leach Maddox (1816–1902), British photographer
Robert Maddox (1870–1965), US politician
Robert Maddox (American football) (born 1954), US American football coach and player
Rose Maddox (1925–1998), US country singer
Sam Maddox (died 1979), British trade unionist
Sean Maddox (born 1983), British writer
Scott Maddox (born 1968), US politician
Tito Maddox (born 1981), US professional basketball player
Tom Maddox (born 1945), US writer
Tommy Maddox (born 1971), US American football player
Walt Maddox (born 1972), US politician
William A. T. Maddox (1814–1889), US Marine
William J. Maddox Jr (1921–2001), United States Army general and aviator
Yvonne Maddox, US medical researcher

See also
Maddox (given name)
Maddox baronets
Maddux (disambiguation)
Maddox (disambiguation)